Glucal is the glycal formed from glucose.  It is a chemical intermediate in the synthesis of a variety of oligosaccharides.

Glucal and its derivatives can be converted to other chemically useful sugars using the Ferrier rearrangement.

References

Monosaccharides
Oxygen heterocycles
Heterocyclic compounds with 1 ring